Otariodibacter is a genus of bacteria from the class of Pasteurellaceae with one known species (Otariodibacter oris). Otariodibacter oris has been isolated from an oral swab from a Californian sea lion from the Copenhagen Zoo in Denmark.

References

Pasteurellales
Bacteria genera
Monotypic bacteria genera